This article lists events from the year 2018 in Zambia.

Incumbents
President: Edgar Lungu
Vice-President: Inonge Wina 
Chief Justice: Irene Mambilima

Deaths

15 May – Wilson Chisala Kalumba, politician (born c. 1964).
11 June – Victoria Kalima, politician (b. 1972).

References

Links

 
2010s in Zambia
Years of the 21st century in Zambia
Zambia
Zambia